Hopes Up may refer to:

 "I Won't", a song by Soul Asylum from the 1995 album Let Your Dim Light Shine
 "Hopes Up", a song by H.E.R. from her 2017 self-titled album